Gibsons is a Canada-based midstream oilfield service company in the oil and gas industry.  Its assets include pipelines, oil storage facilities, as well as a refinery in Moose Jaw.    It is listed on the Toronto Stock Exchange.

History
Gibsons was founded with the incorporation of its predecessor in 1953.  It was initially a subsidiary of Hunting plc, a British firm in the same business. Gibsons was sold by Hunting plc to an energy industry focused private equity fund managed by Riverstone Holdings in December 2008, for C$1.2 billion.  It was later listed on the Toronto Stock Exchange on June 14, 2011.

In 2012, Gibson bought Omni Energy Services for $445 million.  OMNI was an environmental services provider to the American oil and gas industry.

In 2016, Gibsons Energy rejected a $2.8 billion acquisition proposal from a Singapore private equity firm.  In 2017, it sold its industrial propane distribution business, Canwest Propane, to Superior Plus for $412 million.  In 2017, its largest shareholder called for the company to sell its non-core assets, and consider selling the whole company.

Current operations
Gibsons has facilities in locations in both the United States and Canada.  It owns and operates a refinery in Moose Jaw that is Western Canada's largest supplier of the asphalt used for making roofing shingles.  It also runs a number of oil storage terminals, the largest of which is the Hardisty Terminal in Hardisty, Alberta.

Gibsons used to run a trucking service to haul petroleum and other products from and to oil and gas production facilities. The majority of the trucks were leased to independent contractor, who paid upwards of $200 dollars a day for equipment that was supposed to be lease purchased. 
This has been sold to Trimac. The company also buys, sells, and markets oil and gas on the wholesale market.

See also

 List of oilfield service companies

References

Companies based in Calgary
Energy companies established in 1953
Oilfield services companies
Companies listed on the Toronto Stock Exchange
1953 establishments in Alberta
Oil companies of Canada